Calvin Lee Koonce (November 18, 1940 – October 28, 1993) was an American professional baseball player, a right-handed pitcher in the Major Leagues from 1962–71 for the Chicago Cubs, New York Mets and Boston Red Sox. Born in Fayetteville, North Carolina, he grew up in Hope Mills and attended Campbell University.

Koonce appeared in 334 Major League games pitched, all but 90 as a relief pitcher. He allowed 972 hits and 368 bases on balls in 971 innings pitched, with 504 strikeouts and 24 saves. He recorded 11 saves and a low 2.42 earned run average for the 1968 Mets, and was a member of the Mets' 1969 World Series championship team, but he was less effective during the regular campaign and did not appear in the postseason.

As a hitter, Koonce posted a .100 batting average (24-for-239) with 8 RBIs. Defensively, he recorded a .982 fielding percentage, committing only 5 errors in 281 total chances, which was 29 points higher than the league average at his position.

After retiring as an active player, he was head baseball coach of Campbell University, his alma mater, for seven seasons (1980–86), a scout for the Texas Rangers and a minor league executive. He died from lymphoma at age 52.

References

External links

1940 births
1993 deaths
American men's basketball players
Baseball players from North Carolina
Boston Red Sox players
Campbell Fighting Camels baseball players
Campbell Fighting Camels basketball players
Campbell Fighting Camels baseball coaches
Chicago Cubs players
Deaths from cancer in North Carolina
Deaths from lymphoma
Major League Baseball pitchers
New York Mets players
People from Hope Mills, North Carolina
Salt Lake City Bees players
Sportspeople from Fayetteville, North Carolina
Tacoma Cubs players
Texas Rangers scouts
Wenatchee Chiefs players